Ingólfur Jónsson (15 May 1909 – 18 July 1984) was an Icelandic politician and former minister.

References

1909 births
1984 deaths
Ingolfur Jonsson